Elba house is an Amman-based company that manufactures and assembles bus bodies. The company is a partnership divided equally between the Iraqi Ministry of Transportation and a Jordanian family named Khoury.

Headquarters 
Elbahouse's headquarters and factories are located in Amman, with a total area of 100,000 square meters. The constructed area covers approximately 50,000 square meters.

History 
The company was established in 1976 on 10 hectares of land located in Amman, Jordan with a capacity to assemble more than 2000 buses each year. Some of the current production is listed below:
Grand Star
Royal Star
Silver Star
Town Star

References

External links 
Official Elbahouse website

Bus manufacturers of Jordan
Companies based in Amman
Vehicle manufacturing companies established in 1976
1976 establishments in Jordan
Jordanian brands